Tojikiston Soveti (Soviet Tajikistan), also known as Dushanbe Tojikiston Soveti, was a newspaper published in Dushanbe, Tajikistan. It was published during the Soviet Union period,  published between 1955 and 1991. The paper, run by the central committee of the Communist Party of Tajikistan, was a continuation of the earlier papers Idi Tojik (Feast of Tajik) and Bedorii Tojik (Tajik's Awakening) (1925-28), and Tojikistoni Surkh (Red Tajikistan) (1928-1955).

References

Communist newspapers
Defunct newspapers published in Tajikistan
Eastern Bloc mass media
Mass media in Dushanbe
Newspapers published in Tajikistan
Newspapers published in the Soviet Union
Publications established in 1955
Publications disestablished in 1991
1955 establishments in Tajikistan
1991 disestablishments in Tajikistan
1991 disestablishments in the Soviet Union